In astronomy, a collisional family is a group of objects that are thought to have a common origin in an impact (collision). They have similar compositions and most share similar orbital elements.

Known or suspected collisional families include numerous asteroid families, most of the irregular moons of the outer planets, the Earth and the Moon, and the dwarf planets Pluto, Eris, and Haumea and their respective moons.

See also
Satellite collision
Origin of the Moon

References

Minor planet groups and families
Irregular satellites
Trans-Neptunian satellites